Sysquake is a numerical computing environment based on a programming language mostly-compatible with MATLAB. It offers facilities for interactive graphics which give insights into the problems being analyzed. It is used in teaching, research, and engineering.

Sysquake supports two kinds of codes: libraries (collections of related functions which extend Sysquake capabilities), and SQ files, applications with interactive graphics which can have their own menus. Sysquake Pro can also be extended with plugins.

Code 
Several applications share a large part of Sysquake code:

 Sysquake Application Builder  program which creates stand-alone executable applications (bundled with Sysquake Pro)
 Sysquake for LaTeX  Sysquake's language and graphics directly in LaTeX (package file and compiled application)

Libraries are usually compatible with all these applications.

See also 
 List of numerical analysis software
 Comparison of numerical analysis software

References

External links
The Sysquake product page at Calerga

Array programming languages
Numerical programming languages
Statistical programming languages